The South Korea men's national volleyball team  represents South Korea in international volleyball competitions and friendly matches, governed by Korea Volleyball Association. The Republic of Korea (ROK) has competed in the Olympic Games eight times, but has not featured since the 2000 Olympic Games in Sydney, Australia. The national team's best performance at the Olympic Games was 5th place at the 1984 Games in Los Angeles, California, United States. The national team  at the FIVB World Championship competed nine times, with their best result at 4th place in 1978. On continental level, The national team won three gold medals at the Asian Games in 1978, 2002 and 2006. And at the Asian Championship, the national team won four gold medals, two of these was at home in 1989 Seoul and 2001 Changwon and the other two are in 1993 and 2003. The national team now ranks 32nd in the FIVB World Rankings and their current head coach is Im Do-heon.

Results

Olympic Games
 Champions   Runners up   Third place   Fourth place

World Championship

 Champions   Runners up   Third place   Fourth place

World Cup
 Champions   Runners up   Third place   Fourth place

World Grand Champions Cup
 Champions   Runners up   Third place   Fourth place

World League
 Champions   Runners up   Third place   Fourth place

Nations League
 Champions   Runners up   Third place   Fourth place

Challenger Cup
 Champions   Runners up   Third place   Fourth place

Asian Championship
 Champions   Runners up   Third place   Fourth place

Asian Games
 Champions   Runners up   Third place   Fourth place

Asian Cup
 Champions   Runners up   Third place   Fourth place

Team

Current squad
The following is the South Korea roster for the 2022 Asian Men's Volleyball Cup.

Head coach:  Im Do-heon

Former squads
Volleyball at the Summer Olympics – Men's qualification
 Volleyball at the 2020 Summer Olympics – Men's Asian qualification — 3rd place
 Hwang Taek-eui, Han Sun-soo, Na Gyeong-bok, Jeong Min-su, Lee Sang-uk, Heo Su-bong, Kwak Seung-suk, Jung Ji-seok, Choi Min-ho, Jeon Kwang-in, Park Chul-woo, Kim Kyu-min, Shin Yung-suk (c), Kim Jae-hwi. Head coach: Im Do-heon.

World Cup
 2003 World Cup — 6th place
 Ko Hee-jin, Chang Kwang-kyun, Yeo Oh-hyun, Choi Tae-woong (c), Shin Sun-ho, Lee Sun-kyu, Yoon Kwan-yeol, Kim Young-rae, Suk Jin-wook, Lee Hyung-doo, Shin Young-soo and Chang Byung-chul. Head coach: Cha Joo-hyun.

Challenger Cup
 2022 FIVB Volleyball Men's Challenger Cup —  3rd place
 Im Dong-hyeok, Han Sun-soo (c), Hwang Kyung-min, Jeong Min-su, Park Kyeong-min, Hwang Taek-eui, Park Jin-woo, Kim Kyu-min, Kwak Seung-suk, Na Gyeong-bok, Choi Min-ho, Lim Sung-jin, Heo Su-bong, Shin Yung-suk. Head coach: Im Do-heon.

Asian Championship
 2001 Asian Men's Volleyball Championship —  Champions
 Choi Tae-woong, Kim Kyung-hoon, Kim Sang-woo, Shin Sun-ho, Bang Shin-bong, Kim Se-jin, Chang Byung-chul, Shin Jin-sik, Lee Kyung-soo, Suk Jin-wook, Yoon Kwan-yeol, Lee Ho. Head coach: Shin Chi-yong.
 2003 Asian Men's Volleyball Championship —  Champions
 Choi Tae-woong, Kwon Young-min, Shin Sun-ho, Lee Sun-kyu, Park Jae-han, Son Seok-beom, Shin Young-soo, Lee Kyung-soo, Suk Jin-wook, Gu Sang-yoon, Lee Hyung-Doo, Yeo Oh-hyun. Head coach: Cha Joo-hyun.
 2005 Asian Men's Volleyball Championship —   3rd place
 Jang Young-gi, Song In-seok, Park Chul-woo, Kwon Young-min, Yeo Oh-hyun, Kim Sang-gi, Shin Sun-ho, Ha Hyun-yong, Lee Kyung-soo, Lee Hyung-doo, Lee Sun-kyu, Chang Byung-chul. Head coach: Gong Jeong-bae.
 2007 Asian Men's Volleyball Championship —  3rd place
 Kwon Young-min, You Kwang-woo, Ha Hyun-yong, Yun Bong-woo, Lee Sun-kyu, Moon Sung-min, Yang Sung-man, Lee Kyung-soo, Song In-seok, Park Joon-bum, Yeo Oh-hyun, Choi Bu-sik. Head coach: Yoo Joong-tak.
 2009 Asian Men's Volleyball Championship —  3rd place
 Han Sun-soo, Hwang Dong-il, Yun Bong-woo, Lee Sun-kyu, Ha Kyung-min, Kim Yo-han, Kang Dong-jin, Lim Si-hyoung, Park Joon-bum, Choi Hong-suk, Yeo Oh-hyun, Lee Kang-joo. Head coach: Cha Sang-hyun.
 2011 Asian Men's Volleyball Championship —  3rd place
 Han Sun-soo, Kwon Young-min, Shin Yung-suk, Lee Sun-kyu, Ha Kyung-min, Kim Yo-han, Kang Dong-jin, Lee Kyung-soo, Jeon Kwang-in, Choi Hong-suk, Yeo Oh-hyun, Lee Kang-joo. Head coach: Park Ki-won.
 2013 Asian Men's Volleyball Championship —  Runners-up
 Han Sun-soo, Park Sang-ha, Jin Sang-heon, Ha Kyung-min, Kim Jeong-hwan, Shim Kyung-seop, Kwak Seung-suk, Jeon Kwang-in, Song Myung-geun, Ahn Joon-chan, Bu Yong-chan, Oh Jae-seong. Head coach: Park Ki-won.
 2015 Asian Men's Volleyball Championship — 7th place
 Kwon Young-min, Lee Min-gyu, Moon Sung-min, Seo Jae-duck, Song Hee-chae, Choi Hong-suk, Kwak Seung-suk, Choi Min-ho, Shin Yung-suk, Ji Tae-hwan, Jeong Min-su, Oh Jae-seong. Head coach: Moon Yong-kwan.
 2017 Asian Men's Volleyball Championship —  3rd place
 Lee Min-gyu, No Jae-wook, Moon Sung-min, Jung Ji-seok, Song Hee-chae, Park Joo-hyeong, Lee Si-woo, Choi Hong-suk, Lee Kang-won, Kim Jae-hwi, Shin Yung-suk, Jin Sang-heon, Bu Yong-chan, Oh Jae-seong. Head coach: Moon Yong-kwan.
 2019 Asian Men's Volleyball Championship — 4th place
 Hwang Taek-eui, Na Gyeong-bok, Jeong Min-su, Lee Sang-uk, Heo Su-bong, Kwak Seung-suk, Jung Ji-seok, Choi Min-ho, Jin Seong-tae, Jo Jae-sung, Im Dong-hyeok, Kwak Myoung-woo, Shin Yung-suk, Kim Jae-hwi. Head coach: Im Do-heon.

Asian Games
 2010 Asian Games —  3rd place
 Shin Young-soo, Han Sun-soo, Kwon Young-min, Moon Sung-min, Yeo Oh-hyun, Kim Hak-min, Kim Yo-han, Ko Hee-jin, Park Chul-woo, Suk Jin-wook (c), Ha Hyun-yong and Shin Yung-suk. Head coach: Shin Chi-yong.
 2014 Asian Games —  3rd place
 Song Myung-geun, Han Sun-soo (c), Shin Yung-suk, Lee Min-gyu, Park Sang-ha, Kwak Seung-suk, Bu Yong-chan, Choi Min-ho, Jeon Kwang-in, Park Chul-woo, Seo Jae-duck and Jeong Min-su. Head coach: Park Ki-won.

Asian Cup
 2008 Asian Men's Volleyball Cup —  Runners-up
 Chang Kwang-kyun, Park Chul-woo, Moon Sung-min, Yeo Oh-hyun, Choi Tae-woong, Lee Sun-kyu, Ha Hyun-yong, Shin Young-soo, Ko Hee-jin, Kim Yo-han, Hwang Dong-il, Shin Yung-suk. Head coach: Shin Chi-yong.
 2010 Asian Men's Volleyball Cup — 6th place
 Shin Young-soo, Han Sun-soo, Yeo Oh-hyun, Choi Tae-woong, Lee Sun-kyu, Kim Hak-min, Suk Jin-wook, Ko Hee-jin, Choi Hong-suk, Park Jun-bum, Ha Kyoung-mim, Lee Kang-joo. Head coach: Shin Chi-yong.
 2012 Asian Men's Volleyball Cup — 5th place
 Jeon Kwang-in, Park Jin-woo, Lee Min-gyu, Oh Jae-seong, Lee Kang-won, Son Hyun-jong, Song Hee-chae, Jin Seong-tae, Hwang Dong-il, Gu Do-hyeon, Sim Kyoung-sub, Song Myung-geun. Head coach: Park Ki-won.
 2014 Asian Men's Volleyball Cup —  Champions
 Song Myung-geun, Han Sun-soo, Shin Yung-suk, Lee Min-gyu, Park Sang-ha, Kwak Seung-suk, Bu Yong-chan, Choi Min-ho, Jeon Kwang-in, Park Chul-woo, Seo Jae-duck, Jeong Min-su. Head coach: Park Ki-won.
 2016 Asian Men's Volleyball Cup — 8th place
 Lee Sang-uk, Cha Ji-hwan, Son Ju-hyeong, Lee Seung-won, Han Sung-jeong, Kim In-hyeok, Hwang Kyung-min, Jo Jae-sung, Hwang Taek-eui, Im Dong-hyeok, Jung Jun-heuk, Kim Jae-hwi. Head coach: Kim Nam-sung.
 2018 Asian Men's Volleyball Cup — 8th place
 Kwak Myoung-woo, Gim Myeong-gwan, Heo Su-bong, Han Sung-jeong, Park Joo-hyeong, Hong Sang-hyeok, Jeong Seong-gyu, Lee Jeong-jun, Jeon Jin-seon, Lee Sang-hyeon, Han Kuk-min, Jung Sung-min. Head coach: Park Hee-sang.

Kit providers
The table below shows the history of kit providers for the South Korea national volleyball team.

Sponsorship
Primary sponsors include: main sponsors like Shinhan Bank.

See also
V-League
South Korea women's national volleyball team

Notes

References

External links
KVA Official website
FIVB profile

Volleyball
Korea, South
Volleyball in South Korea